Fencing was contested at the 2005 West Asian Games in Doha, Qatar from December 7 to December 9. All competition took place at Al-Arabi Indoor Hall.

Medalists

Medal table

References

External links
Official website (archived)

2005 West Asian Games
2005 in fencing
2005
Fencing competitions in Qatar